Simply KC was a Philippine morning talk show broadcast by ABS-CBN, hosted by KC Concepcion. The program premiered on May 24, 2010, and aired every weekday mornings from 8:00AM to 8:30AM on the network's Umaganda morning block. It also aired worldwide via TFC. The show ended on October 22, 2010 and was replaced by The Adventures of Jimmy Neutron.

Host
KC Concepcion

See also
List of programs broadcast by ABS-CBN

References

ABS-CBN original programming
Philippine television talk shows
Breakfast television in the Philippines
2010 Philippine television series debuts
2010 Philippine television series endings
Filipino-language television shows